Freidig may refer to:

SK Freidig
SK Freidig, merged to form Nordstrand IF in 1919
Freidig, merged to form Jar IL in 1934
Freidig, merged to form Tromsdalen UIL
Freidig, old name of Briskeby FL which merged to form Hamarkameratene
Freidig, old name of IL Tyrving